Harthill is a village and civil parish in the unitary authority of Cheshire West and Chester and the ceremonial county of Cheshire, England.

All Saints Church, Harthill is a Grade II* listed building.

See also

Listed buildings in Harthill, Cheshire

External links

Villages in Cheshire
Civil parishes in Cheshire